William N. Grover ( – after 1871) was a United States Attorney for the eastern district of Missouri. He was one of five defendants tried and acquitted in Illinois for the murder in 1844 of Joseph Smith, founder of the Latter Day Saint movement.

Murder trial

Joseph Smith and his brother Hyrum Smith had been killed by an armed mob during their imprisonment in Carthage Jail on June 27, 1844. As a captain in command of the Warsaw Cadets in the Illinois militia, Grover was accused of having ordered his men to storm the jail and attack the Smiths. Grover had been a leader of the Anti-Mormon Party in Hancock County. At trial, a jury acquitted Grover and four other defendants of the murders.

Law practice
In 1852, after an unsuccessful bid for election to the Illinois General Assembly, Grover moved from Hancock County, Illinois to St. Louis, Missouri. In 1863 he was appointed as a United States Attorney for the eastern district of Missouri. By 1871 he had moved back to Warsaw, Illinois, where he lived until his death.

Notes

References
Dallin H. Oaks and Marvin S. Hill (1975). Carthage Conspiracy: The Trial of the Accused Assassins of Joseph Smith. (Urbana: University of Illinois Press)
 Marvin S. Hill. "Carthage Conspiracy Reconsidered: A Second Look at the Murder of Joseph and Hyrum Smith", Journal of the Illinois State Historical Society, Summer 2004.

Critics of Mormonism
Mormonism-related controversies
People acquitted of murder
People from Warsaw, Illinois
United States Attorneys for the Eastern District of Missouri
1810s births

Year of birth uncertain
Year of death missing